Ales Pushkin ( Aleksandr Nikolaevich Pushkin; Belarusian Алесь Пушкін) (b. August 6, 1965, village Bobr, Krupki District, Minsk Region, Belarus) is a Belarusian non-conformist painter, theater artist, performer, art curator, and political prisoner. He is a member of the Belarusian Union of Artists.

Biography

Education 
In 1978, at the age of 13, Pushkin enrolled in the Republican Boarding School for Fine Arts for talented children named after I.O. Akhremchik in Belarus. His class teacher was Peter Sharyp. After graduating the school in 1983, Pushkin continued his studies in monumental and decorative art at the Belarusian State Theater and Art Institute. In 1984, he was drafted into the Soviet army. He served in Afghanistan and was demobilized in 1986, after which he resumed his studies at the Art  Institute. In 1990, for his diploma, he created a monumental painting "The History of His School" in the lobby of the Republican Boarding School for Fine Arts. The painting covered an area of 215 square meters and took 6 months to complete; it is still displayed there. The painting depicts Francisk Skorina, Mikhail Kleofas Oginsky, Adam Mitskevich, Andrei Tarkovsky, and Vladimir Vysotsky. For this work he was admitted to the Union of Artists of the USSR.

Social Movement 

In addition to the active art exhibition that began during perestroika, Ales Pushkin took an active part in the Belarusian movement of national revival. It was the time of the emergence in Belarus of such historical and cultural youth organizations as "Toloka", which engaged in the restoration of monuments, and  educational activities related to the revival of the Belarusian language and national symbols. In 1988, as a 4th-year university student, Ales Pushkin organized the first circle of the Belarusian Popular Front.

Pushkin is a laureate of the second Charter'97 National Human Rights Prize in the category “For Courage in Art” (1999).

Arrests 
In 1988, for participation in organizing a rally timed to coincide with the autumn Day of Remembrance of Ancestors, Ales Pushkin was arrested for 15 days. On March 25, 1989, during the celebration of the 71st anniversary of the founding of the Belarusian People's Republic, Ales Pushkin carried out the first manifesto of Social Art in Belarus: 12 posters that contradict the state ideology were planned to be displayed in front of the Belarusian Government House. One of the posters depicted the BSSR flag from 1951 with an inscription in Belarusian "Dosyts 'satsyalistychnaya', adrodzim people's Belarus!" ("Enough 'socialistic', let's revive people's Belarus!"). A group of protesters walked from the Theater Institute to the House of Press, where the artist was arrested along with 130 people. 
The authorities reacted with a campaign in the press against the artist. On March 31, 1989, the Presidium of the Supreme Soviet of the BSSR by decree amended the Administrative Code: increased responsibility for the use of unregistered symbols, such as flags, emblems, and pennants. Pushkin was sentenced to two years of probation and five years of disqualification.

As the author of the manifesto of Social Art, Pushkin carried out his first high-profile performance in 1989, for which he was sentenced to two years of probation; he conducted more than a dozen performances thereafter. The most famous of them is "Pus for a President" (1999), during which Ales Pushkin overturned a cart with manure in front of the administration of Lukashenko. For this performance, the artist was sentenced to two years of probation.

Vitebsk Period 
After graduation, Pushkin was assigned to work in Vitebsk, Belarus. Over time, having found premises for his own workshop, he began to prepare the exhibition “Social Art. Declarative Art ". The exhibition was preceded by the performances "November 7", "Vitebsk Behind Jail Bars", "Spring", "Liberty", and "Love". Another manifesto of Social Art was declared on March 25, 1991, on Freedom Day, when Ales Pushkin rode around Vitebsk on a donkey, holding a dove, to the sounds of a brass band. Then, the dove was released with the words: “It will bring us freedom!"

On March 23, 1993, in Vitebsk, Pushkin opened one of the first private non-commercial galleries of contemporary art in Belarus, "At Pushkin", which existed until 1997. The gallery was about 50 square meters and was located near the Marc Chagall Museum. 

Ales Pushkin designed the stage and costume designer for the 7th International Festival of Contemporary Choreography held in Vitebsk in 1994. He was also engaged in scenography at the Yakub Kolas Belarusian Drama Theater, and was a designer for such performances as "King Lear" by W. Shakespeare (director V. Maslyuk, 1993-94), "Frocken Julia" by Y.A. Strindberg (director A. Grishkevich, 1997), and "Nobody Writes to the Colonel" by G.G. Marquez (2001).

Religious Art 
Simultaneously with his activities in Vitebsk, Pushkin carried out the restoration and renovation of church murals in the Mogilev Church of St. Stanislav (now the Cathedral of the Assumption of the Virgin Mary). Some of the murals have presently been removed for political reasons. Many famous Belarusian politicians and church members, including Zenon Poznyak, were included in the paintings.

In 1996, Pushkin painted the monumental walls of the Orthodox church in his native village of Bobr, which was rebuilt after the destruction in 1936. The theme of the painting was the episode of Judgment Day and had a political connotation. On the right hand of Christ there were the righteous, on the left there were the sinners. The angel was blowing the horn. The faces of the sinners bore a resemblance to real people, namely the Metropolitan Filaret and the President of Belarus, Alexander Lukashenko. After the fresco was shown on the RTR TV program “Vesti Nedeli” in 2005, the church authorities sent Archpriest of the Minsk diocese Nikolai Korzhich to Bobr, under whose supervision the scandalous part of the wall painting was removed. By a strange coincidence, this wooden church burned down after it was consecrated by Metropolitan Filaret on February 17, 2011. The church was rebuilt with bricks. Ales Pushkin married his wife in the church in 1997.

Prosecution (2021) 
On March 26, 2021, the General Prosecutor's Office of Belarus opened a criminal case against the artist for showing a portrait of anti-Soviet underground figure Yevgeny Zhikhar at an exhibition in the Grodno Center for Urban Life. The prosecutor's office saw this as a "rehabilitation of Nazism." Pushkin found out about the criminal case but did not cancel the flight from Ukraine, where he had an exhibition, and in the evening of the same day he returned home. At night, his workshop was searched. On March 29, Pushkin was fired from Belrestavratsia, where he worked. The next day he was arrested. 

On April 6, 2021, by a joint statement of eight organizations, including the Viasna Human Rights Centre, the Belarusian Association of Journalists, the Belarusian Helsinki Committee, Pushkin was recognized as a political prisoner. On April 30, 2021, godparenthood  for Pushkin was undertaken by Camilla Hansén, Member of the Riksdag.

On 30 March 2022, Pushkin was handed a 5 years' prison sentence for "incitement to racial, national or religious hatred".

References

Bibliography 
  The Belarusian Alexander Pushkin: holy fool, dissident performance artist
 Алесь Пушкин
 Пушкин в Белоруссии: как художник хулиганов «достал» (in Russian)
 Свободные Новости Плюс: «Наш Пушкин: талантливый, эпатажный, ультрасовременный» (in Russian)
 Свободные Новости Плюс: «Наш Пушкин: талантливый, эпатажный, ультрасовременный» (in Russian)
 Художник Алесь Пушкин: «Второй раз тачку навоза под окна Лукашенко не привез бы» (in Russian)
 Художника Алеся Пушкина оштрафовали за перформанс и неповиновение милиции (in Russian)
 Художника Алеся Пушкина будут судить за перформанс в Крупках (in Russian)
 На свободу вышел художник Алесь Пушкин
 Ales Pushkin's paintings

External links 
 Ales Pushkin's page on the website of the Viasna Human Rights Centre

21st-century Belarusian painters
Belarusian male painters
21st-century male artists
Conceptual artists
Belarusian State Academy of Arts alumni
Belarusian painters
Living people
1965 births
Belarusian artists
Political prisoners according to Viasna Human Rights Centre
Male painters